Svislach Castle was a castle that lay in the lands of present-day Belarus on the right bank of the Byarezina River in the place where it meets the Svislach River. Initially the castle was established as the center of the Duchy of Svislach; it later belonged to the Duchy of Minsk, and from the 14th century to the Grand Duchy of Lithuania. The castle came into the possession of the Radziwill family and one of its prominent owners was Bogusław Radziwiłł.

Online references 
 Svislach Castle at globus.tut.by
 History of Svislach Castle

Buildings and structures in Mogilev Region
Castles in Belarus
Castles and palaces of the Radziwiłł family